Large subunit ribosomal ribonucleic acid (LSU rRNA) is the largest of the two major RNA components of the ribosome.
Associated with a number of ribosomal proteins, the LSU rRNA forms the large subunit of the ribosome. 
The LSU rRNA acts as a ribozyme, catalyzing peptide bond formation.

Characteristics

Use in phylogenetics
LSU rRNA sequences are widely used for working out evolutionary relationships among organisms, since they are of ancient origin and are found in all known forms of life.

See also 
SSU rRNA: the small subunit ribosomal ribonucleic acid.

References 

Ribosomal RNA
Protein biosynthesis